Sodium manganate is the inorganic compound with the formula Na2MnO4.  This deep green solid is a rarely encountered analogue of the related salt K2MnO4.  Sodium manganate is rare because it cannot be readily prepared from the oxidation of manganese dioxide and sodium hydroxide.  Instead this oxidation stops at the level of Na3MnO4, and this Mn(V) salt is unstable in solution.  Sodium manganate can be produced by reduction of sodium permanganate under basic conditions:
4 NaOH + 4NaMnO4 → 4 Na2MnO4 + 2 H2O + O2
Because NaMnO4 is difficult to prepare, sodium permanganate is more expensive than potassium permanganate.

References

Manganates
Sodium compounds